Cali DeWitt (Michael Andrew "Cali" DeWitt, born April 12, 1973) is an artist, photographer, director, designer, and blogger who lives in Los Angeles. He runs the record label Teenage Teardrops.

Life and career
Dewitt was born in Sidney, British Columbia, on Vancouver Island. He moved to Los Angeles, California at the age of three. Dewitt grew up in the San Fernando Valley and moved to New York at the age of 19 after going on tour with the band Hole. Dewitt lived briefly in Seattle while working as Frances Bean Cobain's "manny."  DeWitt appears in drag on the actual cd of Nirvana's In Utero.

DeWitt moved back to Los Angeles and at 21 and workerd as in A&R at Geffen Records for a short time. He worked at the Los Angeles music venue Jabberjaw. He co-founded the label Teenage Teardrops in 2006 with Bryan Ray. Teenage Teardrops has released music from No Age, the Sads, Lucky Dragons, Secret Circuit and Crazy Band. Around the same time DeWitt met his wife Jenna, and several other friends that would come to call themselves the Zen Mafia. The Zen Mafia has but out zines with Ooga Booga, 8ball zines, and maintains a tumblr blog.  From 2011-2014 DeWitt and the Zen Mafia hosted a weekly show on KCHUNG Radio. From 2008-2010 DeWitt and David Kramer ran a gallery in Echo park called Hope Gallery.

DeWitt has published artists books with multiple publishers including New Rose in Town (2013) from Hess Press, and Grave Yard came out in late 2014 on And Press. DeWitt has exhibited artworks at Big Love, Tokyo; Muddguts in New York; V1 Gallery, Copenhagen; and For Your Art, Human Resources, and Family Gallery in Los Angeles.

For the 2015 LA Art Book Fair, DeWitt made a large mural with the text "CRYING AT THE ORGY" and an edition with printed matter called "ADULT BOOKS".

In 2016 DeWitt created the merchandise for Kanye West's The Life of Pablo Tour.

Music videos directed by DeWitt
Destruction Unit - "Final Flight" (2015)
Antwon - "Don't Care" (2014)
Hoax - "Fantasy" (2014)
Iceage - "The Lord's Favorite" (2014)
Omar Souleyman - "Warni Warni" (2014)
Lust For Youth - "Illume" (2014)
Dying In The Pussy - Antwon feat. Andre Martel (2014)
Hunx & His Punx - "Street Punk Trilogy" (2013)
King Tuff - "Keep On Movin'" (2013)
King Tuff- "Bad Thing" (2012)
Living Comfortably - "Dunes" (2012)

Album art
John Wies - Seven Of Wands (CD, Album, Ltd) Pan, 2011		
SQRM - Rodeo (12", Album, W/Lbl, Whi) Youth Attack, 2010	
the Repos - Lost Still Losing (Cass, Album, RM, S/Sided, Ltd)  Youth Attack, 2013		
Hunx and His Punx- Street Punk (LP, Album, Ltd, Yel), Hardly Art, 2013		
Hoax - Hoax, (12" LP") Hoax Records, 2013		
Faith No More - "Motherfucker" (7", Single) Reclamation! Recordings, Ipecac Recordings, 2014		
"On Doing An Evil Deed Blues" (7", EP) Ormolycka, 2014		
Heavy Hearted In The Doldrums (LP, Pic, Album) UNIF 2014 (photo on picture disk)

Publications
Station Fire, Made in Los Angeles Between August and December 2009 (by Jenna Thornhill and Cali Dewitt)
White Girl (MTHM Books) 2013
When I Die 2010, (Cali Dewitt & Mark Mccoy) 
This Natural World (Family) 2010
War News 2011 (Cali and Jenna Thornhill-Dewitt)
Pissing contest 2012
Pit Bull News (wssf) 2014
New Rose in Town (Hess Press) 2013
Grave Yard (And Press) 2014

References

External links
Sexmagazine.us
Teenageteardrops.com
Wichat.biz
highsnobiety.com
Theselby.com
Laweekly.com
Alldayeveryday.com
Huffingtonpost.com
Vaman.com
Juxtapoz.com
Juxtapoz.com
Theheavymetal.com

Living people
1969 births
Canadian photographers
Artists from British Columbia